Winterbottom is a surname. Notable people with the surname include:

 Harold Edward Winterbottom (1879–1953), South Australian businessman
 Ian Winterbottom, Baron Winterbottom (1913–1992), British politician
 Kevin Winterbottom (1955–1976), South African Air Force pilot
 Mark Winterbottom (born 1981), racing driver
 Michael Winterbottom (academic) (born 1934), English classical scholar
 Michael Winterbottom (born 1961), British filmmaker
 Oliver Winterbottom, automotive designer
 Peter Winterbottom (born 1960), rugby union footballer
 Richard Winterbottom (1899–1968), British politician
 Thomas Masterman Winterbottom (1766–1859), English physician
 Walter Winterbottom (1913–2002), British football manager

In fiction 

 Bonnie Winterbottom, a character on the television series How to Get Away with Murder
 Hartley Winterbottom, a character on the television series Chuck
 P.B. Winterbottom, the title character in the computer game The Misadventures of P.B. Winterbottom

See also

 Murgatroyd and Winterbottom, a British comedy double act
 Winterbottom v Wright (1842), an English legal case responsible for constraining the law's stance on negligence
 Winterbotham, a surname